The 2015 Pacific-Asia Junior Curling Championships were held from January 19 to 24 in Naseby, New Zealand. The two South Korean teams, top finishers of each tournament, advanced to the 2015 World Junior Curling Championships in Tallinn, Estonia.

Men

Teams

Round-robin standings

Round-robin results
All draw times are listed in New Zealand Standard Time (UTC+8).

Draw 1
Monday, January 19, 10:00

Draw 2
Monday, January 19, 16:00

Draw 3
Tuesday, January 20, 10:00

Draw 4
Tuesday, January 20, 16:00

Draw 5
Wednesday, January 21, 10:00

Draw 6
Wednesday, January 21, 16:00

Draw 7
Thursday, January 22, 10:00

Draw 8
Thursday, January 22, 16:00

Draw 9
Friday, January 23, 9:00

Draw 10
Monday, January 23, 14:30

Playoffs

Semifinal
Saturday, January 24, 9:00

Final
Saturday, January 24, 14:30

Women

Teams

Round-robin standings

Round-robin results
All draw times are listed in New Zealand Standard Time (UTC+8).

Draw 1
Monday, January 19, 10:00

Draw 2
Monday, January 19, 16:00

Draw 3
Tuesday, January 20, 10:00

Draw 4
Tuesday, January 20, 16:00

Draw 5
Wednesday, January 21, 10:00

Draw 6
Wednesday, January 21, 16:00

Draw 7
Thursday, January 22, 10:00

Draw 8
Thursday, January 22, 16:00

Draw 9
Friday, January 23, 9:00

Draw 10
Monday, January 23, 14:30

Tie-Breaker
Monday, January 23, 19:30

Playoffs

Semifinal
Saturday, January 24, 9:00

Final
Saturday, January 24, 14:30

References

External links

2015 in curling
International curling competitions hosted by New Zealand
Sport in Otago
2015 in New Zealand sport
Pacific-Asia Junior Curling Championships
January 2015 sports events in New Zealand